The Alexander Nevsky Bridge (Most Aleksandra Nevskogo) in St Petersburg, Russia is named after the legendary Russian military commander and politician Alexander Nevsky.  The bridge connects Alexander Nevsky Square and Zanevsky prospect thus linking the southern and the northern parts of the city. Until 2004, when the Big Obukhovsky Bridge was built, the Alexander Nevsky bridge was the longest bridge across the Neva River in Saint Petersburg. Its length is 905.7 meters, and it is 35 meters wide.
The bridge was built from 1960 to 1965 under the working name of  Old Neva Bridge. 
Designed by the group of architects A. Zhuk, S. Mayofis and Y. Sinitsa, the bridge has complemented the look of adjacent buildings in surrounding area.  The project was led by a team of engineers of the "Lengiprotransmost" institute. Proof-testing was done by means of a column of army tanks. On November 5, 1965, the bridge was open for traffic.

Summer navigation 
For the period of summer navigation a number of bridges on the rivers of Saint-Petersburg including the Alexander Nevsky Bridge are opened  to allow ships to pass. The bridge consists of seven bridge spans and the central span of 50 meters can be opened in two minutes.

See also 
 List of bridges in Saint Petersburg

References

External links
 http://sumay.mysite.syr.edu/nevaworkshop/bridges1.htm

Bridges built in the Soviet Union
Bridges in Saint Petersburg
Bridges completed in 1965